Michael Scheike (born 11 September 1963) is a former German footballer and current manager.

Career

As a player, he spent his entire career with Eintracht Braunschweig, including two seasons in the Bundesliga, as well as five seasons in the 2. Bundesliga. He was also capped twice for the West German U-21 national team. In 1991 an injury forced Scheike to retire from playing. Since then, he has been a manager, mostly in youth and amateur football. He has also managed Rot-Weiss Essen for a short time in 2001.

References

External links

1963 births
Living people
Sportspeople from Braunschweig
Association football defenders
German footballers
German football managers
Germany under-21 international footballers
Eintracht Braunschweig players
Eintracht Braunschweig II players
Rot-Weiss Essen managers
Bundesliga players
2. Bundesliga players
Footballers from Lower Saxony